Inmer, also known as Aznamir, village in Goghtn Region of Armenia, currently included into Ordubad region of Nakhichevan autonomy of Azerbaijan.

Currently ruins of Armenian church has remained. Armenian population left the village in 19th century.

Populated places in Armenia